Ofoase and Ayirebi are two of the four area councils that constitute the Akyemansa District. 

Kojo Oppong Nkrumah is the member of parliament for the constituency. He was elected on the ticket of the New Patriotic Party (NPP).
and won a majority of 17,796  votes to become the MP. He had represented the constituency in the 7th parliament of the 4th Republic held on the 7th of December 2016.

See also
 List of Ghana Parliament constituencies

References

Parliamentary constituencies in the Eastern Region (Ghana)